Numba Nadan Apata Pissu is a 2003 Sri Lankan Sinhala comedy action film directed by Milton Jayawardena and produced by Sunil Aruna Weerasiri. It stars Bandu Samarasinghe and Sasanthi Jayasekara in lead roles along with Ravindra Yasas, and Ananda Wickramage. Music composed by Somapala Rathnayake. It is the 1007th Sri Lankan film in the Sinhala cinema.

Plot

Cast
 Bandu Samarasinghe as Samsung Almeida 'Baby Talky' / Mr. Almeida 'Loku Hamu'
 Sasanthi Jayasekara as Sepalika Malwanna
 Ravindra Yasas as Diesel
 Ananda Wickramage as 'Sakaladosha Dhuribhootha' Gurunnanse
 Anton Jude as PC Walbanda
 Vasantha Vittachchi as Weera
 Rajitha Hiran as Patiya
 Ronnie Leitch as Mister Balthazar
 Janesh Silva as 'Avathewa' Balky Talky's servant
 Arjuna Kamalanath as Mahesh Damunupola guest appearance, Sepalika's Lover
 Sanet Dikkumbura as 'Sathya Prema Brunga Raj' Music Master
 Ariyasena Gamage as Tamil Sergeant
 Srinath Maddumage as Army husband
 Manel Wanaguru as Sepalika's mother
 Felician Fernando as Dancer
 Ashain Fernando as Dancer

Soundtrack

References

2004 films
2000s Sinhala-language films
2003 action comedy films
2003 films
Sri Lankan comedy films
2004 comedy films